Chetanas Hazarimal Somani College Of Commerce & Economics and Chetana's Institute of Management & Research commonly known as Chetana College is a college located in Bandra(E), Mumbai, India, affiliated to the University of Mumbai.It is the 2nd oldest B-School in Mumbai. It is recognized by the University Grants Commission (India) and accredited by National Assessment and Accreditation Council (NAAC)  with "A" Grade.

See also
List of colleges in Mumbai

References

External links

Universities and colleges in Mumbai
Educational institutions established in 1961
Affiliates of the University of Mumbai